In geometry, an intersection is a point, line, or curve common to two or more objects (such as lines, curves, planes, and surfaces). The simplest case in Euclidean geometry is the line–line intersection between two distinct lines, which either is one point or does not exist (if the lines are parallel). Other types of geometric intersection include:
 Line–plane intersection
 Line–sphere intersection
 Intersection of a polyhedron with a line
 Line segment intersection
 Intersection curve

Determination of the intersection of flats – linear geometric objects embedded in a higher-dimensional space – is a simple task of linear algebra, namely the solution of a system of linear equations. In general the determination of an intersection leads to non-linear equations, which can be solved numerically, for example using Newton iteration. Intersection problems between a line and a conic section (circle, ellipse, parabola, etc.) or a quadric (sphere, cylinder, hyperboloid, etc.) lead to quadratic equations that can be easily solved. Intersections between quadrics lead to quartic equations that can be solved algebraically.

On a plane

Two lines 

For the determination of the intersection point of two non-parallel lines

 

one gets, from Cramer's rule or by substituting out a variable, the coordinates of the intersection point  :
 
(If  the lines are parallel and these formulas cannot be used because they involve dividing by 0.)

Two line segments 

For two non-parallel line segments  and  there is not necessarily an intersection point (see diagram), because the intersection point  of the corresponding lines need not to be contained in the line segments. In order to check the situation one uses parametric representations of the lines:
 
 
The line segments intersect only in a common point  of the corresponding lines if the corresponding parameters  fulfill the condition . 
The parameters  are the solution of the linear system 
 

It can be solved for s and t using Cramer's rule (see above). If the condition  is fulfilled one inserts  or  into the corresponding parametric representation and gets the intersection point .

Example:  For the line segments  and  one gets the linear system

That means: the lines intersect at point .

Remark: Considering lines, instead of segments, determined by pairs of points, each condition  can be dropped and the method yields the intersection point of the lines (see above).

A line and a circle 

For the intersection of
line  and circle  
 

if  If this condition holds with strict inequality, there are two intersection points; in this case the line is called a secant line of the circle, and the line segment connecting the intersection points is called a chord of the circle.

If  holds,  there exists only one intersection point and the line is tangent to the circle. If the weak inequality does not hold, the line does not intersect the circle.
 

If the circle's midpoint is not the origin, see. The intersection of a line and a parabola or hyperbola may be treated analogously.

Two circles 

The determination of the intersection points of two circles
 
can be reduced to the previous case of intersecting a line and a circle. By subtraction of the two given equations one gets the line equation: 

This special line is the radical line of the two circles.

Special case  : 
In this case the origin is the center of the first circle and the second center lies on the x-axis (s. diagram).

In case of  the circles have no points in common. 
In case of  the circles have one point in common and the radical line is a common tangent.

Any general case as written above can be transformed by a shift and a rotation into the special case.

The intersection of two disks (the interiors of the two circles) forms a shape called a lens.

Two conic sections 
The problem of intersection of an ellipse/hyperbola/parabola with another conic section leads to a system of quadratic equations, which can be solved in special cases easily by elimination of one coordinate. Special properties of conic sections may be used to obtain a solution. In general the intersection points can be determined by solving the equation by a Newton iteration. If a) both conics are given implicitly (by an equation) a 2-dimensional Newton iteration b) one implicitly and the other parametrically given a 1-dimensional Newton iteration is necessary. See next section.

Two smooth curves 

have an intersection point, if they have a point of the plane in common and have at this point 
 a: different tangent lines (transversal intersection), or
 b: the tangent line in common and they are crossing each other (touching intersection, see diagram).

If both the curves have a point  and the tangent line there in common but do not cross each other, they are just touching at point .

Because touching intersections appear rarely and are difficult to deal with, the following considerations omit this case. In any case below all necessary differential conditions are presupposed. The determination of intersection points always leads to one or two non-linear equations which can be solved by Newton iteration. A list of the appearing cases follows:

If both curves are explicitly given: , equating them yields the equation
 
If both curves are parametrically given: 
 Equating them yields two equations in two variables:
  
If one curve is parametrically and the other implicitly given: 
This is the simplest case besides the explicit case. One has to insert the parametric representation of  into the equation  of curve  and one gets the equation:

If both curves are implicitly given: 
 Here, an intersection point is a solution of the system

Any Newton iteration needs convenient starting values, which can be derived by a visualization of both the curves. A parametrically or explicitly given curve can easily be visualized, because to any parameter  or  respectively it is easy to calculate the corresponding point. For implicitly given curves this task is not as easy. In this case one has to determine a curve point with help of starting values and an iteration. See
.

Examples:
1:  and circle  (see diagram). 
 The Newton iteration  for function 
 has to be done. As start values one can choose −1 and 1.5.
The intersection points are: (−1.1073, −1.3578), (1.6011, 4.1046)
2:
  (see diagram). 
 The Newton iteration 
 has to be performed, where  is the solution of the linear system
 at point . As starting values one can choose(−0.5, 1) and (1, −0.5).
 The linear system can be solved by Cramer's rule.
The intersection points are (−0.3686, 0.9953) and (0.9953, −0.3686).

Two polygons 

If one wants to determine the intersection points of two polygons, one can check the intersection of any pair of line segments of the polygons (see above). For polygons with many segments this method is rather time-consuming. In practice one accelerates the intersection algorithm by using window tests. In this case one divides the polygons into small sub-polygons and determines the smallest window (rectangle with sides parallel to the coordinate axes) for any sub-polygon. Before starting the time-consuming determination of the intersection point of two line segments any pair of windows is tested for common points. See.

In space (three dimensions) 

In 3-dimensional space there are intersection points (common points) between curves and surfaces. In the following sections we consider transversal intersection only.

A line and a plane 

The intersection of a line and a plane in general position in three dimensions is a point.

Commonly a line in space is represented parametrically   and a plane by an equation . Inserting the parameter representation into the equation yields the linear equation 

for parameter  of the intersection point .

If the linear equation has no solution, the line either lies on the plane or is parallel to it.

Three planes 
If a line is defined by two intersecting planes  and should be intersected by a third plane , the common intersection point of the three planes has to be evaluated.

Three planes  with linear independent normal vectors  have the intersection point 
 
For the proof one should establish  using the rules of a scalar triple product. If the scalar triple product equals to 0, then planes either do not have the triple intersection or it is a line (or a plane, if all three planes are the same).

A curve and a surface 

Analogously to the plane case the following cases lead to non-linear systems, which can be solved using a 1- or 3-dimensional Newton iteration.
parametric curve  and 
parametric surface 
parametric curve  and 
implicit surface 

Example:
parametric curve   and 
implicit surface  (s. picture).
The intersection points are: (−0.8587, 0.7374, −0.6332), (0.8587, 0.7374, 0.6332).

A line–sphere intersection is a simple special case.

Like the case of a line and a plane, the intersection of a curve and a surface in general position consists of discrete points, but a curve may be partly or totally contained in a surface.

A line and a polyhedron

Two surfaces 

Two transversally intersecting surfaces give an intersection curve. The most simple case is the intersection line of two non-parallel planes.

See also 
 Analytic geometry#Intersections
 Computational geometry
 Equation of a line
 Intersection (set theory)
 Intersection theory

References

Further reading
 Nicholas M. Patrikalakis and Takashi Maekawa, Shape Interrogation for Computer Aided Design and Manufacturing, Springer, 2002, 9783540424543, pp. 408.